Salpingothrips is a genus of thrips in the  family Thripidae. There are at least three described species in Salpingothrips.

Species
These three species belong to the genus Salpingothrips:
 Salpingothrips aimotofus Kudo, 1972
 Salpingothrips hoodi Ananthakrishnan
 Salpingothrips minimus Hood

References

Further reading

 
 
 
 
 
 

Thripidae
Articles created by Qbugbot